EUPM may refer to:

 European style power metal, a subgenre of heavy metal music
 European Union Police Mission, any of a number of European Union military and civilian overseas missions

Disambiguation pages